This is a list of episodes from the third season of Extreme Makeover: Home Edition.

Episodes

See also
 List of Extreme Makeover: Home Edition episodes
 Extreme Makeover: Home Edition Specials

Notes

References

2005 American television seasons
2006 American television seasons